Henry Man (1747–1799) was an English author.

Man was deputy-secretary of the South Sea House and colleague of Charles Lamb. He contributed essays to The Morning Chronicle; his works were collected, in 1802.

References

1747 births
1799 deaths
18th-century British writers